Günthner is a German-language surname. Notable people with this surname include:

 (born 1964), German soccer referee
 (born 1976), German politician

See also
Günther
Güntner

German-language surnames